Mid Sussex District Council is elected every four years.

Political control
The first elections to the council were held in 1973, initially acting as a shadow authority before coming into its powers on 1 April 1974. Political control of the council since 1973 has been held by the following parties:

Leadership
The leaders of the council since 2006 have been:

Council elections
1973 Mid Sussex District Council election
1976 Mid Sussex District Council election
1979 Mid Sussex District Council election
1983 Mid Sussex District Council election (New ward boundaries & district boundary changes also took place)
1984 Mid Sussex District Council election
1986 Mid Sussex District Council election (District boundary changes took place but the number of seats remained the same)
1987 Mid Sussex District Council election
1991 Mid Sussex District Council election
1995 Mid Sussex District Council election (District boundary changes took place but the number of seats remained the same)
1999 Mid Sussex District Council election
2003 Mid Sussex District Council election (New ward boundaries)
2007 Mid Sussex District Council election
2011 Mid Sussex District Council election
2015 Mid Sussex District Council election
2019 Mid Sussex District Council election

By-election results

References

External links
Mid Sussex District Council

 
Council elections in West Sussex
District council elections in England